A Pistol Shot is a 1966 Soviet drama film directed by Naum Trakhtenberg.

Plot 
The film tells about an officer named Silvio, who decides to challenge the count to a duel as a result of a slap in the face. Suddenly he leaves and returns only many years later on the eve of the count’s wedding.

Cast 
 Mikhail Kozakov as Silvio
 Yury Yakovlev
 Ariadna Shengelaya
 Oleg Tabakov as Belkin
 Valeri Babyatinsky as Enseigne (as V. Baryatinsky)
 Vladlen Davydov as Colonel
 Boris Novikov as Kuzka
 Lev Polyakov

References

External links 
 

1966 films
1960s Russian-language films
Soviet drama films
1966 drama films
Films based on works by Aleksandr Pushkin